Spark Unlimited, based in Sherman Oaks, California, was a video game developer founded by former developers from the Medal of Honor video game franchise. 

The studio's first game was Call of Duty: Finest Hour  in 2004. Its last game was Yaiba: Ninja Gaiden Z in 2014. Spark Unlimited has a game average Metacritic score of 53 out of 100.

Spark Unlimited was wholly owned by employees. The company shut down in May 2015.

Games by Spark Unlimited

References

External links
Spark Unlimited official website

Defunct video game companies of the United States
Video game development companies
Video game companies established in 2002
Video game companies disestablished in 2015
2002 establishments in California
2015 disestablishments in California
Defunct companies based in Greater Los Angeles